Indian Institute of Management may refer to:

 Indian Institutes of Management
 Indian Institute of Management Calcutta located in Kolkata, West Bengal, India 
 Indian Institute of Management Ahmedabad located in Ahmedabad, Gujarat, India 
 Indian Institute of Management Bangalore located in Bangalore, Karnataka, India 
 Indian Institute of Management Lucknow located in Lucknow, Uttar Pradesh, India 
 Indian Institute of Management Kozhikode located in Kozhikode, Kerala, India 
 Indian Institute of Management Indore located in Indore, Madhya Pradesh, India
 Indian Institute of Management Shillong located in Shillong, Meghalaya, India  
 Indian Institute of Management Rohtak located in Rohtak, Haryana, India
 Indian Institute of Management Ranchi located in Ranchi, Jharkhand, India
 Indian Institute of Management Raipur located in Raipur, Chhattisgarh, India
 Indian Institute of Management Tiruchirappalli located in Tiruchirappalli, Tamil Nadu, India 
 Indian Institute of Management Udaipur located in Udaipur, India
 Indian Institute of Management Kashipur located in Kashipur, India
 Indian Institute of Management Nagpur located in Nagpur, India